Nothoprodontia boliviana is a species of beetle in the family Cerambycidae, the only species in the genus Nothoprodontia.

References

Trachyderini
Monotypic beetle genera